Bibbins is a surname. Notable people with the surname include:

Justin Bibbins (born 1996), American basketball player 
Kirsten Bibbins-Domingo, American epidemiologist and physician
Mark Bibbins (born 1968), American poet

See also
Hibbins